The Paraguaian hairy dwarf porcupine (Coendou spinosus) is a porcupine species from the family Erethizontidae. It is found in Argentina, Brazil, Paraguay and Uruguay.

They have a short tail and gray brown quills and feed on fruits, ant pupae, vegetables and roots.

This species was formerly sometimes assigned to Sphiggurus, a genus no longer recognized since genetic studies showed it to be polyphyletic. The population formerly recognized as the orange-spined hairy dwarf porcupine (Sphiggurus villosus) has been reclassified to this species. Its closest relatives are the bicolored-spined porcupine (Coendou bicolor) and the black dwarf porcupine (Coendou nycthemera).

References

John F. Eisenberg and Kent H. Redford, 2000. Mammals of Neotropics: Ecuador, Bolivia and Brazil.

Coendou
Mammals described in 1822
Taxa named by Georges Cuvier